Diana Darke (born 6 March 1956) is an author, Middle East cultural writer, Arabist and occasional BBC broadcaster. Her work has appeared in the Guardian, the Financial Times, the Sunday Times, the Daily Telegraph and Al Araby. She graduated from Wadham College, Oxford, in 1977, where she studied German and Philosophy/Arabic, then went on to work for the British Government Communications Headquarters (GCHQ) and Racal Electronics Plc as an Arabic consultant. In 2005, Darke purchased a 17th-century courtyard house in the Old City of Damascus.

Publications
 Syria, Bradt Travel Guides, 2010, .
 Oman, Bradt Travel Guides, 2010, .
 North Cyprus, Bradt Travel Guides, 2012, .
 Eastern Turkey, Bradt Travel Guides, 2014, 
 My House in Damascus: An Inside View of the Syrian Crisis, Haus Publishing, 2016, .
 The Merchant of Syria: A History of Survival, Hurst Publishers, 2018, .
The Last Sanctuary in Aleppo (co-author), Headline Publishing, 2019, .
Stealing from the Saracens: How Islamic Architecture shaped Europe, Hurst Publishers, 2020, 
The Ottomans: A Cultural Legacy, Thames & Hudson, 2022,

Notes and references

External links
Official website
 

1956 births
Living people
Alumni of Wadham College, Oxford
English women journalists